Washington Square may refer to:

Places
 Washington Square (Bangkok), Thailand
 Washington Square, Pasadena, California, a neighborhood of Pasadena, CA
 Washington Square (Brookline), Massachusetts
 Washington Square (MBTA station), Brookline
 Washington Square (Charleston), South Carolina
 Washington Square, New Orleans, Louisiana, in the Faubourg Marigny
 Washington Square (Newport, Rhode Island)
 Washington Square (Philadelphia), Pennsylvania, park
 Washington Square West, Philadelphia, neighborhood
 Washington Square (Salt Lake City), Utah
 Washington Square (San Francisco), California
 Washington Square, Savannah, Georgia
 Washington Square, Syracuse, New York
 Washington Square Park (Chicago), Illinois
 Washington Square Park, Greenwich Village, New York City

Buildings
 Washington Square (Detroit), Michigan
 Washington Square Village, New York City
 Washington Square (Bellevue, Washington)

Shopping centers
Washington Square (Oregon), Tigard, Oregon
Washington Square Mall (Evansville, Indiana)
Washington Square Mall (Indianapolis, Indiana)

Arts and entertainment

Music
 "Washington Square" (composition), a 1963 instrumental by the Village Stompers
 "Washington Square", a 2008 song by Counting Crows from Saturday Nights & Sunday Mornings
 Washington Squares, an American folk pop group 1983–1991

Other media
 Washington Square (novel), an 1880 novel by Henry James
 Washington Square (film), a 1997 adaptation directed by Agnieszka Holland
 Washington Square (TV series), a 1956–1957 American musical comedy series
 Washington Square News, the student newspaper of New York University

See also
Washington Square Historic District (disambiguation)
Washington Square Park (disambiguation)